The Corn Exchange is a former chapel, trading facility and military installation at Bank Street in Tonbridge, Kent.

History
The building was originally designed as a chapel for the Independent Congregationalists and completed in 1790. The Independent Congregationalists moved out in 1876 and the chapel became used as the local Corn Exchange. The building was then converted to become the headquarters of the 4th Battalion, The Queen's Own (Royal West Kent Regiment) in 1910. It also became the headquarters of the Kent Cyclist Battalion at this time. The 4th Battalion was mobilised at the drill hall in August 1914 before being deployed to India.

The battalion merged with the 5th Battalion to form the 4th/5th Battalion in 1947. Following the cut-backs in 1967, the presence at the drill hall was reduced to a single company, E Company, 5th (Volunteer) Battalion, The Queen's Regiment. The drill hall was subsequently decommissioned and converted for commercial use.

References

Buildings and structures in Kent
Drill halls in England
Tonbridge